This is a list of compositions by Ignaz Brüll.

Piano

Piano Solo
Orientalisches Klagelied, Op. 3/1
Ritt durch die Wüste, Op. 3/2
Orientalisches Totenklage, Op. 3/3
Tarantella, Op. 6
Impromptu, Op. 7/1
Humoreske, Op. 7/2
Seven Fantasie pieces for piano, Op. 8
Romance, Op. 11/1
Impromptu, Op. 11/2
Mazurka, Op. 11/3
Schlummerlied, Op. 13/1
Sartarella, Op. 13/2
Romance, Op. 13/3
Improvisata e Fuga, Op. 17
Scherzo, Op. 20/1
Scherzo, Op. 20/2
Impromptu, Op. 28/1
Romance, Op. 28/2
Étude, Op. 28/3
Sieben Albumblätter für die Jugend, Op. 33
Mazurka, Op. 34/1
Barcarole, Op. 34/2
Capriccio, Op. 34/3
Theme with Variations, Op. 35/1
Mazurka, Op. 35/2
Impromptu, Op. 37/1
Idylle, Op. 37/2
Paysage, Op. 37/3
Romance, Op. 38/1
Caprice, Op. 38/2
Étude, Op. 38/3
Impromptu, Op. 38/4
Mazurka, Op. 38/5
Bolero, Op. 38/6
Theme with Variations, Op. 39
Waltz-Impromptu, Op. 44/1
Kleine Studie, Op. 44/2
Theme with Variations, Op. 45
Melodie, Op. 45/1
Ballade, Op. 45/2
Gavotte, Op. 47/1
Phantasiestück, Op. 47/2
Waltz, Op. 50/1
Octaven Étude, Op. 50/2
Berceuse, Op. 51/1
Capriccio, Op. 51/2
Scherzo-etude, Op. 51/3
Valse-Caprice, Op. 53/1
Melodie, Op. 53/2
Gavotte, Op. 53/3
Grande Valse, Op. 54/1
Introduction and Tarantelle, Op. 54/2
Menuet, Op. 54/3
La Vendange, Op. 54/4
Champagner-Märchen, Op. 54A
Herbstabend, Op. 57/1
Tarantelle, Op. 57/2
Étude, OP. 57/3
Romance, Op. 57/4
Scherzo-Impromptu, Op. 57/5
Präludium, Op. 58/1
Scherzo, Op. 58/2
Theme with Variations, Op. 58/3
Gavotte, Op. 58/4
9 Études, Op. 61
Mazurka, Op. 69/1
Mazurka, Op. 69/2
Ländler, Op. 69/3
Präludium, Op. 71/1
Scherzo, Op. 71/2
Quasi Variazoni, Op. 71/3
Rondo (in alter Weise), Op. 71/4
Lied, Op. 72/1
Mazurka, Op. 72/2
Marsch, Op. 72/3
Schlummerlied, Op. 72/4
Piano Sonata in D minor, Op. 73
Präludium, Op. 76/1
Capriccio, Op. 76/2
Legende, Op. 76/3
Sarabande, Op. 76/4
Ballade, Op. 76/5
Aria and Scherzo, Op. 76/6
Präludium, Op. 80/1
Menuett, Op. 80/2
Cavatine, Op. 80/3
Scherzo, Op. 80/4
Finale, Op. 80/5
Nocturne, Op. 83/1
Ophelia, Op. 83/2
Barcarolle, Op. 83/3
Capriccio, Op. 83/4
Ballade, Op. 84
Tanzweise, Op. 89/1
In slawischer Weise, Op. 89/2
Berceuse, Op. 93/1
Impromptu, Op. 93/2
Reigen, Op. 93/3
Gondoliera, Op. 94/1
Mache à la Japonaise, Op. 94/2
Barcarolle and Tarantelle, Op. 96/1
Liebliche Landschaft, Op. 96/2
Gnomenmärchen, Op. 96/3
Menuett, Op. 101/1
Gavotte, Op. 101/2
Novellette, Op. 102/3
Berceuse
Spanischer Tanz
Walzer

Two Pianos
Sonata for two pianos, Op. 21
Duo for two pianos, Op. 64

Chamber music

Violin and Piano
Suite for Piano and Violin, Op. 42
Violin Sonata No. 1, Op. 48
Violin Sonata No, 2, Op. 60
Violin Sonata No. 3, Op. 81
Mazurka for Violin and Piano, Op. 90/1
Tarantelle for Violin and Piano, Op. 90/2
Espagnole for Violin and Piano, Op. 90/3
Violin Sonata No. 4, Op. 97

Cello and Piano
Cello Sonata, Op. 9

Piano Trio
Piano Trio in E-flat major, Op. 14

Orchestral

Symphonies
Symphony in E minor, Op. 31

Piano and Orchestra
Piano Concerto No, 1 in F major, Op. 10
Piano Concerto No. 2 in C major, Op. 24
Rhapsody for Piano and Orchestra, Op. 65
Allegro and Andante for Piano and Orchestra, Op. 88
Tanzweisen for Piano two hands, four hands and orchestra, Op. 89

Violin and Orchestra
Violin Concerto in A minor, Op. 41

Other
Im Walde, overture for Orchestra, Op. 25
Serenade No. 1 in F for Orchestra, Op. 29
Serenade No. 2 in E for Orchestra, Op. 36
Macbeth, overture for Orchestra, Op. 46
Tanzsuite aus der Ballettmusik: Ein Märchen aus der Champagne für Orchester, Op. 54
Serenade No. 3 in F for Orchestra, Op. 67
Waltz for Female choir and Orchestra, Op. 91
Overture Pathétique for Orchestra, Op. 98
Three intermezzi for Orchestra, Op. 99

Opera
Das goldene Kreuz, Op. 27
Der Landfriede, Op. 30
Königin Mariette, Op. 40
Das steinerne Herz, Op. 55
Gringoire, Op. 66
Schach dem König, Op. 70
Der Husar, Op. 79

Choral Music
Zwei Männerchören, Op. 16
Zyklus Toskanischer Lieder, Op. 22
Süßes Begräbnis, Op. 23
Zwei Chöre, Op. 26
Zwei Männerchöre, Op. 59
Drei Männerchöre
Frauenchöre

Lieder
Träum ich oder wach ich, Op. 1/1
Abendlied, Op. 1/2
Nachtreise, Op. 1/3
Lebewohl, Op. 2/1
Nachtlichte, Op. 2/2
Das Ständchen, Op. 2/3
Es schauen die Blumen alle, Op. 5 H.I,1
Wenn ich auf dem Lager liege, Op. 5 H.I,2
Jedweder Geselle sein Mädel am Arm, Op. 5 H.I,3
Sie liebten sich beide, Op. 5 H.I,4
Ich wollt', meine Schmerzen ergössen sich, Op. 5 H.I,5
Manch' Bild vergess'ner Zeiten, Op. 5 H.I,6
Das verlassene Mägdlein, Op. 5 H.II,1
Ligurisches Volkslied, Op. 5. HII,2
Waldeinsamkeit, Op. 5 H.II,3
Am Traunsee, Op. 5 H.III,1
Der schwere Abend, Op. 5 H.III,2
Trauer, Op. 5 H.III,3
Sehnsucht, Op. 12/1
Gewitternahen, Op. 12/2
Ein Aufatmen, Op. 12/3
O süße Mutter, Op. 12/4
Die alte Weide, Op. 15 H.I,1
Meiner Mutter ihr Spinnrad, Op. 15 H.I,1
Schlummerlied, Op. 15 H.II,1
Christbaum, Op. 15 H.II,2
Nanny, meine Rose, Op. 18/1
Wie lang und traurig ist die Nacht, Op. 18/2
Peggy, Op. 18/3
Polly Stewart, Op. 18/4
Jessie, Op. 18/5
Es war 'ne Man, Op. 18/6
Mein Eigen soll sie sein, Op. 19 H.I,1
Abschied, Op. 19 H.I,2
Gruß, Op. 19 H.I,3
Liedchen der Sehnsucht, Op. 19 H.I,4
An die Strene, Op. 19 H.II,1
An einen Schmetterling, Op. 19 H.II,2
Sehnsucht, Op. 32/1
Es war im Mai, Op. 32/2
Gerstennähren, Op. 32/3
Das zerbrochene Ringlein, Op. 43/1
Zigeunerlager, Op. 43/2
Ständchen, Op. 43/3
Hohes Lied, Op. 43/4
Niedlich' Schätzchen, Op. 49/1
Die Holde Pech, Op. 49/2
Mein Treues Lieb Nancy, Op. 49/3
Mein Stren, Op. 52/1
Das Meeresleuchten, Op. 52/2
Die Pappeln, Op. 52/3
Die Verlassene, Op. 52/4
Die blinde Mutter, Op. 56/1
Wiegenlied, Op. 56/2
Menie, Op. 56/3
Um Mitternacht, Op. 56/4
Wo?, Op. 56/5
Einmal noch, Op. 56/6
Lied, Op. 56/7
Wenn still mit seinen letzten Flammen, Op. 62/1
Du fragst mich, Op. 62/2
Ländliches Frühlingslied, Op. 62/3
Gondoliera, Op. 62/4
Liebesglück, Op. 62/5
Antwort, Op. 63/1
Abendlied, Op. 63/2
Phillis, mein Kind, Op. 63/3
Herab von den Bergen, Op. 63/4
Vom Mummelsee, Op. 63/5
Vergessen, Op. 68/1
Willst du mein sein, Op. 68/2
Gute Nacht, Op. 68/3
Lied der Spinnerin, Op. 68/4
Weißt du noch?, Op. 74/1
In dunkler Nacht, Op. 74/2
Täglich, wenn der Abend naht, Op. 74/3
Durch das abendliche Dunkel, Op. 75/1
Kleine Welt, Op. 75/2
Auf einsamen Wegen, Op. 75/3
So oft ich deine sah, Op. 77/1
O Glaube, wenn von deiner Huldgestalt, Op. 77/2
Der Augenstern, Op. 77/3
Die Harfe, die für dich erklungen, Op. 77/4
Mädchens Abendgedanken, Op. 78/1
Ger nam kühlen Waldessaum, Op. 78/2
O Gib die Seele mir zurück, Op. 78/3
Am Weßdorn, Op. 78/4
Vom Wald bin i fura, Op. 82/1
Wann i Geh, Op. 82/2
's launische Dirndl, Op. 82/3
Mei Dirndl is sauba, Op. 82/4
Der Abschied, Op. 82/5
Der Steinhauer, Op. 85/1
Sechse, sieben  oder acht, Op. 85/2
Trinklied, Op. 85/3
Dein' Augen, Op. 86/1
Notturno, Op. 86/2
Mein Odem möchte sich ein Plätzchen, Op. 86/3
Du wirfst die Angel, Op. 86/4
Die Spröde, Op. 87/1
Die Bekehrte, Op. 87/2
Nachtlied, Op. 92/1
Auf dem Maskenball, Op. 92/2
Wiegenlied für meinen Jungen, Op. 92/3
Die Tänzerin, Op. 95/1
Hochzeitlied, Op. 95/2
Elisabeth (Meine Mutter hat’s gewollt), Op. 95/3
Blaublümelein, Op. 95/4
Beim Feste, Op. 100/1
Ich glaub', Op. 100/2
Letze Worte, Op. 100/3
Zwei Könige, Lied, Op. 102
Wir sind die Weihnachtsengel
Nachtwandler

External links
List of compositions by Ignaz Brüll (and free scores) at the International Music Score Library Project 
Detailed listings by Opus number and composition type at the Brüll Rediscovery Project, www.ignazbrull.com

Brull, Ignaz